King Mu of Chu (died 614 BC) was from 625 to 614 BC king of the state of Chu during the Spring and Autumn period of ancient China.  He was born Xiong Shangchen and King Mu was his posthumous title.

Prince Shangchen was the son of King Cheng of Chu and was the original Crown Prince.  In 626 BC King Cheng tried to make his other son Prince Zhi the new crown prince on the advice of his wife Zheng Mao.  When Shangchen learned of his father's plan, he surrounded the palace with his soldiers and forced King Cheng to hang himself.  Shangchen then 
ascended the throne.  He was succeeded by his son King Zhuang of Chu.

References

Monarchs of Chu (state)
7th-century BC Chinese monarchs
614 BC deaths
Year of birth unknown
Chinese kings